Sirk in Iran may refer to:
 Sirk, Chaharmahal and Bakhtiari
 Sirk, Isfahan

See also
Sirk (disambiguation)